Cobras Brasil XV is a professional rugby union team based in São Paulo, Brazil. The team was founded in 2021 to compete in Súper Liga Americana de Rugby. Cobras replaced the rugby section of Corinthians, which had been the original franchise for the SLAR.

Overview 
Cobras became the second professional Brazilian franchise after Corinthians, the only team which did not play a single match in the cancelled 2020 season. Corinthians had only played one warm-up match in Montevideo against Peñarol Rugby (a 45–14 defeat, on February 26). SLAR's season was cancelled in March, one day before Corinthians' first match against Olímpia Lions in Asunción.

When the original team ended its contract in 2020, the CBRu decided to create a new franchise.

Stadium 
Due to the COVID-19 pandemic, the Brazilian team won't play at home in the 2021 season. The team is based in São Paulo. The training center is the Núcleo de Alto Rendimento de São Paulo (NAR). The home stadium for the 2022 season is yet to be confirmed.

Current squad  
The Cobras Brasil XV squad for the 2023 Super Rugby Americas season is:

 Senior 15s internationally capped players are listed in bold.

See also

 Brazil national rugby union team

References

External links
 

Brazilian rugby union teams
Sport Club Corinthians Paulista
Rugby clubs established in 2021
2021 establishments in Brazil
Super Rugby Americas